WOOZ may refer to:

 WOOZ-FM, a radio station (99.9 FM) licensed to Harrisburg, Illinois, United States
 WOOZ radio, an indie-rock and electronic music internet radio station that has broadcast via Live365 since 1999
 WOOZ, a network of small shops in Belgium producing and selling personalised gifts since 1992
 WOOZ, a virtual currency used in Woozworld, a social universe designed for kids aged 8 to 14.